Bonjar (also Romanized as Bonjār) is a city in the Central District of Zabol County, Sistan and Baluchestan province, Iran. At the 2006 census, its population was 3,619, in 847 families. At the 2016 census, its population had risen to 3,760.

References

Zabol County
Populated places in Zabol County
Cities in Sistan and Baluchestan Province